Martely is a rural locality (a village) in Beryozovsky District, Perm Krai, Russia. The population was 51 as of 2010.

Geography 
Martely is located 17 km northeast of  Beryozovka (the district's administrative centre) by road. Potanitsy is the nearest rural locality.

References 

Rural localities in Beryozovsky District, Perm Krai